The Robert Award is a Danish film prize awarded each year by the Danish Film Academy. It is the Danish equivalent of the American Oscars, British BAFTAs for films and Australian AACTA Awards. The award—voted only by academy members—is an acknowledgment by Danish industry colleagues of a person's or film's outstanding contributions during the previous year. Since 2013, awards have been given to television series and actors as well. The Robert was awarded for the first time in 1984 and is named after the statuette's creator, the Danish sculptor Robert Jacobsen.

Categories

Current

Discontinued

Records

People 

The following nominees received multiple nominations (10 or more):

The following winners received multiple awards (5 or more):

 Manon Rasmussen holds the record for most wins and nominations in a single category with 17 and 35, especially for Best Costume Design.
 In von Trier's fourth trilogy, Depression, is the first franchise or trilogy to have sweep seven Roberts; Best Danish Film, Best Director, Best Screenplay, Best Cinematography, Best Editing, Best Sound, and Best Visual Effects.

See also 
 Bodil Awards

References

External links 
 
 Listing of the major Robert Award recipients at Scope Film Guide

 
1984 establishments in Denmark
Awards established in 1984
Danish film awards